is a former Japanese football player.

Playing career
Takata was born in Hiroshima Prefecture on December 6, 1977. He joined J1 League club Sanfrecce Hiroshima from youth team in 1996. However he could not play at all in the match. In 1997, he moved to Japan Football League club Brummell Sendai (later Vegalta Sendai). He played many matches from first season and the club was promoted to J2 League from 1999. He retired end of 1999 season.

Club statistics

References

External links

biglobe.ne.jp

1977 births
Living people
Association football people from Hiroshima Prefecture
Japanese footballers
J1 League players
J2 League players
Japan Football League (1992–1998) players
Sanfrecce Hiroshima players
Vegalta Sendai players
Association football forwards